Scottee is an artist and writer from Kentish Town, North London

His early work has often been acknowledged as controversial, throwing cake at Rihanna as part of an X Factor performance and spitting milkshake over Nick Grimshaw. On one occasion the police arrived at one performance of 'Mess' to investigate a suspected breach of public indecency laws. The police found no evidence of illegal activity.

More recently, Scottee has turned to creating activist artworks and projects with communities across the UK and Ireland. These have included working with his grandfather to tackle ageism, public artwork in Southend addressing queer trauma, Hamburger Queen - a talent show for fat people exploring fat activism, establishing Peterborough Pride, participant led dance show Fat Blokes and stage show Class looking at poverty and class system in the UK

Scottee has written on subjects for newspapers such as The Guardian, i-D Magazine and Global Citizen In a piece in The Guardian expressing concerns about pay and the problems of working in the arts industry he characterises it as; "The arts are essentially a namby-pamby life of stealing Wi-Fi, cheap coffee, waiting tables and overpriced weekend workshops in improvisation that leaves you, at times, financially and mentally unstable."

He is a regular contributor to BBC Radio 4's Loose Ends after first appearing on the programme on 18 December 2012., he has also written columns and presented for Front Row and Cultural Front Line. In 2020 Scottee became the host of After The Tone podcast, first published in August that year.

From 2013 - 2016 Scottee was Associate Artist at Roundhouse, London. In 2017 Scottee became Associate Research Fellow at Birkbeck Centre for Contemporary Theatre, University of London and 2018 he became an Associate Artist at HOME, Manchester.

Scottee is the Artistic Director of Scottee & Friends Ltd. which he established in 2017 with Executive Producer Molly Nicholson.

Radio
Loose Ends (2012 - present)
Front Row, Punk (2016)
Short Cuts, Noel (2019)
Flip, Bog Standard (2019)
Short Cuts, Remix (2020) 
Front Row, Risk List (2020)

Awards and recognition
Associate Research Fellow at Birkbeck Centre for Contemporary Theatre, University of London (2017)

Early life
Scottee was born on Queens Crescent, Kentish Town West Estate. He was expelled from school aged 14 after which he never returned to education. He has no formal training or qualifications.

See also
Loose Ends (radio)

References

External links
 Official website

Living people
British comedians
Year of birth missing (living people)